The 48th Assembly District of Wisconsin is one of 99 districts in the Wisconsin State Assembly.  Located in south-central Wisconsin, the district comprises the north and east side of the city of Madison, in Dane County.  It includes Madison neighborhoods such as Sherman Village, Brentwood Village, Reindall Park, and Door Creek Park, as well as local landmarks such as Warner Park, Dane County Regional Airport, East Towne Mall, Lake View Sanatorium, Madison Area Technical College, and the American Family Insurance corporate headquarters.  The seat is represented by Democrat Samba Baldeh since January 2021.

The 48th Assembly district is located within Wisconsin's 16th Senate district, along with the 46th and 47th Assembly districts.

List of past representatives

References 

Wisconsin State Assembly districts
Dane County, Wisconsin